RSDP may refer to:

 Root System Description Pointer; see EFI system partition
 Road Sector Development Program, in Transport in Ethiopia